Wheelchair basketball was played at the 2019 Parapan American Games. The two finalists in the women's tournament and the three medalists in the men's tournament qualified for the 2020 Summer Paralympics.

Medalists

Men's tournament

Group A

Results summary

Group B

Results summary

Final rounds
Quarterfinals

Semifinals

Bronze medal match

Gold medal match

Women's tournament

Group A

Results summary

Group B

Results summary

Final rounds
5-8th classification matches

7/8th classification match

5/6th classification match

Semifinals

Bronze medal match

Gold medal match

See also
Basketball at the 2019 Pan American Games
Wheelchair basketball at the 2020 Summer Paralympics

References

2019 Parapan American Games
International basketball competitions hosted by Peru
Wheelchair basketball at the Parapan American Games